Glaston Oyj Abp is a Finnish glass processing technology company that manufactures glass processing machinery and provides related maintenance and upgrade services to industries such as architecture, automotive, solar energy, furniture and appliances. 

In addition to Finland, Glaston has production facilities in Germany, Switzerland and China.

History

Hammarén & Co (1870–1940) 
The company was originally a forestry company, and was founded in Kyröskoski in 1870 when Lars Johan Hammarén and Gustaf Oscar Sumelius bought a hydroelectric cotton mill near the river. The company was called Hammarén & Co. 

A wood mill was established on the site in 1872, a paper mill in 1878 and a sawmill in 1912.

The company introduced a new paper machine in the 1930s and began cardboard production.

Kyro (1941–2006) 
In 1941 the company adopted the nameOy Kyro Ab. Kyro's production expanded into wallpaper and magazine paper in the 1950s and 1960s.

Kyro began to specialize in glass in 1981 after acquiring the glass industry company Tamglass Oy. In 1985, Tecnomen Oy, a supplier of automation and control technology, was also acquired.

Until the mid-1990s, Kyro focused on selling its forest industry-related business. 

In June 1991, Tamglass acquired HBI Tempering Systems. The company, located near Philadelphia, manufactured tempering equipment for the glass industry. With the acquisition, Tamglass moved manufacturing of machines marketed in North and South America to the United States.

In 1992, Kyro's main products were wallpaper, paperboard, lumber, safety glass machinery and safety glass. About 75 percent of its turnover came from wood processing.

In June 1995, Metsä-Serla acquired Oy Kyro Wood Ltd, which had focused on board and paper production, and Oy Kyro Board & Paper Ltd, which had operated a sawmill business. Kyro was left with the Kyröskoski power plant, Tecnomen, which specialised in telecommunications and access control technology, Tamglass, which produced automotive glass and glass machinery, and a share in the Metsä-Rauma pulp mill planned for city of Rauma.

In January 1996, Pentti Yliheljo took over as CEO, succeeding Kai Matikainen. Kyro acquired Cattin Machines, a Swiss-based company specializing in safety glass.

Kyro was listed on the Helsinki Stock Exchange in June 1997. The group had three business areas: Tamglass, a manufacturer of safety glass machines, Tecnomen, a specialist in paging systems, and Kyro Power, an energy company.

In March 2001 Kyro Plc Abp was split into two companies, Kyro Plc Abp and Tecnomen Holding Plc. Kyro received a capital gain of 40 million euros from the Tecnomen IPO.

In late 2002, Kyro announced that it would acquire the Italian company Z. Bavelloni, an Italian manufacturer of glass pre-processing machines, and Glaston, a Dutch company that sold Z. Bavellon products. The deal was worth 66 million euros. Uniglass Oy was bought from Tampere, Finland.

The merger of Tamglass and Bavelloni created Glaston Technologies.

Glaston (2007–2019) 
In February 2007, Kyro announced that it would change its name to Glaston, as Glaston had been the company's main business since 2003. The company also retained Tamglass and Bavellon as its brands. The company had decided to abandon its other business area, energy production. The Kyro power plant was sold to M-Real in the summer. 

In spring 2009, Interpane Glass Oy acquired the processing operations focused on insulating and architectural glass from Glaston's subsidiary, Tamglass Lasinjalostus.

In October 2012, it was announced that Glaston would sell its Software Solutions business, which had been created in 2007 when the company had acquired Albat + Wirsam Software Group.

In August 2014, Glaston acquired the intellectual property rights to the products of the Finnish company Glassrobots.

In June 2017, Ahlström Capital became Glaston's largest shareholder (18 %), after acquiring the shares previously held by G. W. Sohlberg.

In January 2019, Glaston announced the acquisition of Swiss-German glass processing company Bystronic Maschinen AG and Bystronic Lenhardt GmbH and its subsidiaries for 68 million euros. The companies were almost the same size, for example in 2017 Glaston had a turnover of 110 million euros and Bystronic glass 107 million euros. Bystronic glass's products included insulating glass production lines for the architectural market and pre-processing lines for automotive and display glass. The transaction led to a share issue of around 32 million euros, almost half of which was directed at the company's largest shareholders. Shares were oversubscribed.

Glaston (2020–) 
In January 2020, Glaston underwent a re-organisation, with the creation of three business segments.

Following the retirement of the company's long-time CEO Arto Metsänen, Anders Dahlblom, was appointed as his successor, starting in January 2021. In August, the company published an updated strategy with a geographic focus on China, where the growth potential was the biggest. In November, it was announced that Cimec had acquired Glaston's glass handling business in Germany. The German employees were not part of the deal, but Glaston staff remained with the company. Glaston intended to concentrate on machinery for automotive glass production, heat treatment machinery, and the manufacture of insulating glass manufacturing equipment.

Organisation 
Glaston is headquartered in Helsinki in Finland and has factories in Tampere in Finland, Neuhausen (Enzkreis) in Germany, Bützberg in Switzerland and Tianjin in China.

As of October 2021, Glaston's largest shareholders were Ahlstrom Capital, Hymy Lahtinen Oy, Varma Mutual Pension Insurance Company, Ilmarinen, and OP Financial Group.

Products and services 
Glaston has three business areas 

 Glaston Heat Treatment Technologies, which manufactures heat treatment machines for flat tempering, bending, bending and tempering and laminating of glass
 Glaston Insulating Glass Technologies, which produces insulating glass production lines and glass processing equipment used in the processing of architectural glass
 Glaston Automotive & Display Technologies, which offers various products for the processing of automotive, furniture and display glass, such as glass cutting equipment and complete pre-processing lines for the production of automotive, furniture and display glass.

Glaston's machines and production lines are used to manufacture glass for applications such as cars and buildings. Glaston's products have been used to make windows for example for Helsinki Central Library Oodi.

Glaston offers products related to smart glass technologies to the automotive, solar energy and aerospace industries. For example, an integrated manufacturing line has been developed for Heliotrope Technologies in California to produce a smart glass product based on Heliotrope's nanotechnology.

In 2021, services accounted for about one third of total turnover.

Glaston organises the international Glass Performance Days conference. For example, in 2011 it was attended by around 800 guests from around the world. GDP conferences have been held in Tampere every two years but they have also been held in places such as China and Istanbul.

Glaston conducts product development, for example, through DIMECC Oy's MIDAS project, which focuses on artificial intelligence and also includes Novatron, Nokia Technologies, Epec and the University of Tampere.

Acknowledgements 

 In 1983 Tamglass was awarded the President of the Republic of Finland Internationalisation Award
 In October 2021, a panel of judges assembled by Kauppalehti selected the best Awards reports of listed companies. Glaston's report was the best in the category of small listed companies.

References

External links 

 Glaston
Manufacturing companies of Finland